Prsa or PRSA may refer to:

 Prša, a municipality in Slovakia
 Anja Prša (born 1994), Slovenian footballer
 President of the Royal Scottish Academy
 Personal Retirement Savings Account, a type of savings account for the Irish market
 Proportional Representation Society of Australia, an Australian electoral reform group
 Public Relations Society of America, an American trade association
 Parvulin-like peptidyl-prolyl isomerase, an enzyme